This is a list of all clubs that have taken part in the German football championship from 1903 to 1963, in the era when the national championship was decided by a finals round with a national title game at the end.

The German football championship was first held in 1903 and won by VfB Leipzig. In 1904, the championship was not completed due to a protest by Karlsruher FV about a technicality, with all games but the final played. The competition was held again in 1905 and, from then on, annually.

The championship was interrupted by the World War I, and not held from 1915 to 1920, when football returned to more organised fashion after the disruptions caused by the war.

In 1922, the final was inconclusive and Hamburger SV was declared champions but declined the honor. After this, a championship was held every season until 1944. With the expansion of Nazi Germany, clubs from occupied territories or annexed countries took part in the competition, including teams from Austria, France, Luxembourg, Poland, and Czechoslovakia.

The German championship resumed in 1948, three years after the end of the World War II. Germany, now greatly reduced in size, originally was divided into four occupation zones; from 1949 into three political entities, the German Democratic Republic, known in English as East Germany, the Saar Protectorate, now the German Federal State of the Saarland, and the Federal Republic of Germany, widely called in English,  West Germany.

The clubs from the Saar protectorate remained within the German football league system for the most part and continued to take part in the national championship. East German clubs did not. SC Planitz, the team from Zwickau, in Saxony qualified for the 1948 championships at Nuremberg, but was refused a travel permit by the Soviet authorities.  After 1948, no clubs from the East entered the championship again.

The German championship continued to operate in this form until 1963, when the system was superseded by the Bundesliga as a means of determining the national champion.

With thirty-one appearances, Hamburger SV holds the record, while 1. FC Nürnberg won the most titles, eight, followed by FC Schalke 04 with seven. The now defunct VfB Königsberg has the most appearances in the national finals without ever reaching the championship game, sixteen.

List

A

B

C

D

E

F

G

H

I

J

K

L

M

N

O

P

R

S

T

W

 Bold denotes champions and championship-winning seasons.
 Italics denotes club was from territories outside of what is now the Federal Republic of Germany.

Sources
 kicker Allmanach 1990, by kicker, page 160 & 178 - German championship
 Pre-1933 Football leagues in Germany Das Deutsche Fussball Archiv 
 Germany - Championships 1902-1945 at Rec.Sport.Soccer Statistics Foundation
 Hirschi's Fussballseiten - History of German football , Results and tables up until 1933

References

+clubs
Championship